Parfreyville is an unincorporated community in the town of Dayton, Waupaca County, Wisconsin, United States. The community was founded in 1851 by Robert Parfrey.

Notes

Unincorporated communities in Waupaca County, Wisconsin
Unincorporated communities in Wisconsin